Lalanne is a surname. Notable people with the name include:

 Alfredo Lalanne (born 1983), Argentine rugby player
 Cady Lalanne (born 1992), Haitian professional basketball player
 Carlos Lalanne (born 1906), Chilean sports shooter
 Francis Lalanne (born 1958), French-Uruguayan singer, songwriter, and poet
 Jack LaLanne (1914–2011), American fitness, exercise, nutritional expert
 Léon Lalanne (1811–1892), French engineer and politician
 Ludovic Lalanne (1815–1898), French historian and librarian
 Maxime Lalanne (1827–1886), French etcher and drawer
 Stanislas Lalanne (born 1948), French Roman Catholic bishop